Brandon is a masculine given name which originates from two or possibly three separate sources, two Celtic, the other, Anglo-Saxon, and has historically been used by these different cultures independently. Today, most people with the name do not have any connection or lineage with any of these sources and use them as if they were the same name. In the instances of the Celtic origins, it is either a variant of the Irish masculine given name, Breandán, meaning prince or king, or descended from the Old Welsh name Brân, meaning "crow" or "little raven". The Anglo-Saxon origin is the  surname Brandon.

Origin of the name

The given name Brandon as a variant form of the Irish given name Brendan is an Anglicised form of the Old Irish name, Bréanainn, which is in turn derived from the earlier Old Irish Brénainn. The mediaeval Latin form of the name, Brendanus, has influenced its spelling in the modern English and Irish forms. However, the name has no meaning in the Irish language, and was absorbed from the Old Welsh breenhin, meaning Prince or Chieftain.

In the instance of the Welsh "Bran" as the origin, meaning "crow" or "little raven", there is also a general Celtic nebula of related words and names across the European continent.

In the instance of a more probable Anglo-Saxon origin, the surname can be derived from any of the numerous place-names in England, composed of two elements (brōm + dūn) derived from the Old English language. The first element, brōm, means "broom" or "gorse", and the second, dūn, means "hill". Such places can include: Brandon, County Durham; Brandon, Northumberland; Brandon, Suffolk; Brandon, Warwickshire; and other locations. However, one location, Brandon in Lincolnshire, may be connected to the River Brant, which runs close by. This river's name is derived from two Old English elements: brant, meaning "steep", "deep"; and dūn, meaning "hill" The name of this location is probably in reference to the river's steep banks. A famous instance of the use of 'Brandon' as a surname is that of Charles Brandon, 1st Duke of Suffolk. He was a close friend and brother-in-law of King Henry VIII. In certain cases, it can be the French surname Brandon, which derives from the other French surname Brand, itself from the Old French brand, brant "sword" or from the French word brandon "burning material to set fire". Variant form is Brandin.

Statistics

Australia

In Australia's most populated state, New South Wales, in the year 2009, Brandon did not crack the top 100 male, or top 100 female, names of babies registered in New South Wales.

Canada

In the Canadian province of British Columbia, the name ranked as the 66th most popular male name for the year 2007; it did not rank as a female name (to rank the name had to have been used by 5 or more occurrences).

Chile

In Chile, the name has not cracked the top 50 male names in the years spanning 1999 to 2006; from 2003 to 2006 it was amongst the top 100 male names.

Rank and percent of the male name

The Netherlands
In the year 2009, Brandon was the 160th most common male name, recorded in births, in the Netherlands; there were 67 occurrences of the name recorded that year. The previous year the name ranked 159th, with 73 recorded occurrences.

Republic of Ireland

Rank of male Irish baby births, and rank of male Irish names

Sweden

In Sweden, there were 230 males registered in 2009 who had the first name Brandon; of these men, 170 recorded the name as a nickname. In the years spanning 2002 to 2009, the name was not amongst the top 100 male, or female, baby names.

United Kingdom

In the United Kingdom, the name has risen in popularity since the mid-1990s.

England and Wales
In England and Wales, in the year 2008, Brandon was the 70th most common male baby name, along with Breasen being a form of Brandon or meaning son of Brandon, with 1,011 occurrences recorded. It had fallen in rank, slightly from the previous year when it was ranked 66th most common, with 1161 occurrences. The name has dramatically fallen in popularity since 1998, when it was ranked 36th, with 2142 occurrences recorded.

Rank and numbers of English and Welsh baby births

Northern Ireland

In Northern Ireland, Brandon was not amongst the top 20 names of male, or female, babies born in the year 2009. It did not crack the top 100 male, or the top 100 female, names registered in the two previous years either. In 2002 the name was ranked 84 most common male baby name, falling drastically from 30th ranked name the year before.

Rank and numbers of male Northern Irish baby births

The name did not rank amongst the top 100 male baby names in 2007 and 2008.

Scotland

In Scotland, in the year 2009, the name was ranked as the 90th most common names for male babies, with 67 occurrences recorded. The name had dramatically fallen in popularity from the previous year. In the years 1998 and 1999, the name was the 46th most common name for male births, although the name has fallen in rank in almost every year since then.

Rank and percent of male Scottish baby births

United States

The name is, for the most part, found in North America. In 1982, the name was the 7th most common given name amongst African American males, and the 23rd most common name amongst White American males. The name was ranked in the 1990 United States Census as being the 68th most common name amongst males.

The Social Security Administration website lists the top 1,000 American baby names for every year since 1879. In the year 1950, Brandon first reached the top 1,000 male names for babies who were registered for Social Security numbers for births. That year it was the 936th most common masculine name. From that year until the beginning of the 1990s, the name has, for the most part, risen in popularity with every successive year. It reached its peak in the years 1992, 1993, and 1994, when it was the 6th most popular name amongst male babies. The name has fallen in popularity in almost every year since then; in 2009, it was ranked the 38th most common name registered that year.

Brandon is considered to be a very masculine name; however, in the United States it has also been used as a feminine name. In 1981, it reached the top 1,000 female names for babies who were registered for Social Security numbers for births; that year it was the 748th most common female name registered for births. The name stayed within the top 1,000 female names from 1981 to 1988, fluctuating in rank; it reached its peak in 1985, when it ranked 661st; in 1988, it ranked 990th.

In 2009, the names Brandon and Bryan were ranked as the 15th most common names for male twins, according to Social Security number applications for births.

Years when the name ranked amongst the top 1,000 American baby names

The following table lists the year and rank when Brandon ranked amongst the top 1,000 male, or the top 1,000 female, baby names in the United States. If no rank is given in the table, then the name was not amongst the top 1,000. The highest rank for males, and for females, is labelled in boldface.

Feminine forms

It has been stated that the feminine given name Brandy is derived from a word referring to a liquor called "brandy wine", or "brandewine". These English words are derived from the Dutch language brandewijn, meaning "burnt wine", in reference to a distilled wine. However, the name Brandy is now considered to be more likely a feminine form of Brandon. Variant forms of Brandy include: Brandie, and Brandi.

People with the name Brandon

Actors
 Brandon Chang, Taiwanese actor and musician (born 1985)
 Brandon T. Jackson, American actor, comedian, rapper and writer (born 1984)
 Brandon Lee, American actor and martial artist (1965–1993)
 Brandon McClelland, Australian actor (born 1992)
 Brandon McInnis, American voice actor
 Brandon Jay McLaren, Canadian actor (born 1980)
 Brandon Routh, American actor (born 1979)
 Brandon Scott, American actor, voice actor and producer (born 1981)
 Brandon Mychal Smith, American actor, singer, dancer and rapper (born 1989)

See also

Brandan, given name and surname
Branden (given name)
Brandin, name

References

English-language masculine given names
English masculine given names
Given names originating from a surname
Masculine given names
North American given names